Sylvestra Le Touzel (born 1958) is an English television, film and stage actor. She was born and raised in Kensington, London, to a prominent family from Saint Helier, Jersey, Channel Islands. She attended school in East Acton.

Television
Beginning as a child actor, Le Touzel's first television role was in the Doctor Who story The Mind Robber, playing one of the children who bedevil the Second Doctor and his companions in the Land of Fiction. She co-starred in the BBC Schools "Look and Read" series, playing Helen in their serial The Boy from Space (1971), which was re-edited with a new introduction in 1980. An early adult role was as Fanny Price in the BBC dramatisation of Jane Austen's Mansfield Park (1983).

Le Touzel has also been seen on television in shows as diverse as Dixon of Dock Green, The Brontes of Haworth, The Uninvited, Catherine Cookson's The Gambling Man as Charlotte Keane (1995),The Gentle Touch, The Professionals, Lovejoy, Alas Smith and Jones, Midsomer Murders, My Family and The Long Walk to Finchley (as Patricia Hornsby-Smith).  In 1994, she played Sarah Teale in the TV series Between the Lines. In 2000, Le Touzel was cast as a veterinary surgeon in the sitcom Beast, written by Simon Nye, which also starred Alexander Armstrong.

In 2007, she also played the role of Mrs Allen in the ITV adaptation of Northanger Abbey. She has also played Harriet Waterhouse in the ITV drama Bonkers.

She also appeared in a classic Heineken advert "The Water in Majorca" with Bryan Pringle. This advert, a parody of the Rain in Spain scene from My Fair Lady, sees an upper-class woman (Le Touzel) being taught how to speak cockney by Pringle's character, by saying "The wa'er in Major'a don' taste like wot id ough' 'a" ("The water in Majorca don't taste like what it ought to"). First aired in 1985, it was ranked at number 9 in Campaign Live's 2008 list of the "Top 10 Funniest TV Ads of All Time", and at number 29 in Channel 4's list of the "100 Greatest TV Ads" in 2000.

In 2011, she starred as Detective Constable Hazel Savage in Appropriate Adult. In 2012, Le Touzel starred as MP Mary Drake in BBC2's The Thick of It. Le Touzel starred in the second episode of Dirk Gently as Emelda Ransome. She portrayed Lucy, Lady Duff-Gordon in the 2012 ITV mini-series Titanic. In 2015, Le Touzel appeared as Sandra Kendrick in the BBC TV series Death in Paradise episode 4.7. In 2017, she portrayed Lady Dorothy Macmillan in the Netflix series The Crown.
In 2020, Le Touzel played Christine, the GCHQ boss main character in the comedy series Intelligence.

In 2014, Le Touzel appeared in the BBC sitcom Big School, playing an Ofsted Inspector.

Film
Le Touzel played Marianne Thornton in the 2006 film Amazing Grace   and appeared in Happy-Go-Lucky. 

In the 2012 film Cloud Atlas, she portrayed three different characters through the movie: Haskell Moore's Dinner Guest 5, Nurse Judd and Aide in Slaughtership.

In 2017, Le Touzel played Nina Khrushcheva, wife of Nikita Khrushchev, in The Death of Stalin.

Personal life
Le Touzel married Welsh actor Owen Teale, as his second wife in 2001, several years after they had met during a production of Henry IV in 1991; the couple have two daughters. Le Touzel is a supporter of charitable theatre and in 2005 became a patron of Montage Theatre Arts, London, along with fellow actress Debby Bishop.

Filmography

Film

Television

References

External links
 
 Sylvestra Le Touzel at the BFI

Living people
1958 births
English film actresses
English stage actresses
English television actresses
Date of birth missing (living people)
Jersey actresses
21st-century English actresses
20th-century English actresses
English child actresses